Eduard Riedel (February 1, 1813 – August 24, 1885) was a German architect and Bavarian government building officer. Among other things he is known for his contribution to the construction of Neuschwanstein Castle.

Biography 

Riedel was born in Bayreuth. He began to study architecture in Bayreuth and graduated in Munich, the Bavarian capital, in 1834.

Riedel's first project was the supervision of the new development of the Ludwigstraße Damenstift (convent) in Munich. This was followed by the residence and palace garden for King Otto of Greece in Athens, where he was court architect until he returned to Munich in 1850. Here he completed the Propylaea jointly with Leo von Klenze. From 1852 until 1857, Riedel was a professor at the polytechnic institute. In 1853 he was appointed superintendent of the royal building authorities and in 1872 he became the leading court architect.

His works include the Wolfram von Eschenbach Monument in Wolframs-Eschenbach, numerous fountains in the garden of Schleissheim Palace, the Beamtenreliktanstalt and Bavarian National Museum in Munich, as well as numerous drafts and concepts such as for the Cistercian monastery in Mehringen, a new university and a coin. He was also responsible for the restoration of numerous palaces.

Riedel died in Starnberg.

Oeuvre (selection) 

 1848–64: Concepts for the grave of Maximilian II of Bavaria
 1849–51: Reconstruction of Berg Castle on Lake Starnberg
 1852–53: Completion of the Casino on the Roseninsel in Lake Starnberg
 1852–77: Concepts for the front of the Maximilian-II-Kaserne in Munich
 1854–56: Extension of Leo von Klenze's bazaar building at Odeonsplatz, Munich
 1856–58: Reconstruction of Herzog Max Castle in Munich
 1857: Royal hunting house near Ettal
 1859–63: Bavarian National Museum, now housing the State Museum of Ethnology in Munich
 1861–63: Concepts for front of the Neue Kaserne (New Barracks) in Regensburg
 1862: Concepts for gardens of Feldafing Palace
 1862–63: Concepts for new university at Karlsplatz in Munich
 1863–65: Beamtenreliktanstalt in Munich
 1864: Mausoleum for Maximilian II in Theatine Church, Munich
 1869–1874: Concept for Neuschwanstein Castle
 1870-1874: Assumption Church, Saint Paul, Minnesota, USA

References 
 

1813 births
1885 deaths
19th-century German architects
Architects of the Bavarian court